In mathematics, particularly matrix theory, a Stieltjes matrix, named after Thomas Joannes Stieltjes, is a real  symmetric positive definite matrix with nonpositive off-diagonal entries.  A Stieltjes matrix is necessarily an M-matrix.  Every n×n Stieltjes matrix is invertible to a nonsingular symmetric nonnegative matrix, though the converse of this statement is not true in general for n > 2.

From the above definition, a Stieltjes matrix is a symmetric invertible Z-matrix whose eigenvalues have positive real parts. As it is a Z-matrix, its off-diagonal entries are less than or equal to zero.

See also 
 Hurwitz matrix
 Metzler matrix

References
 
 

Matrices
Numerical linear algebra